was a district located in Hyōgo Prefecture, Japan.

As of 2008, the district had an estimated population of 40,334 and a density of 257.03 persons per km2. The total area was 157.49 km2.

Former towns and villages
 Takino
 Tōjō
 Yashiro

Merger
 On March 20, 2006 - the towns of Takino, Tōjō and Yashiro were merged to create the city of Katō. Katō District was dissolved as a result of this merger.

Former districts of Hyōgo Prefecture